Ca is a genus of moths of the family Dalceridae.

Species
 Ca anastigma Dyar, 1914

Former species
 Ca restricta Schaus, 1940

References

Dalceridae
Zygaenoidea genera